Matthew Turner A.K.A Matty Turner (born 29 December 1981) is an English football striker and wide midfielder. He retired from his footballing career in 2006, and now works as a Mental Performance Coach.

Born in Nottingham, Turner started his career at Nottingham Forest as a youngster. He earned promising reviews in the youth team at Forest, and West Bromwich Albion signed him in 2000. At West Brom he was unable to break into the first team, so he was initially loaned out to Danish club Herfølge in April 2002; he impressed during his time at the club, and the move was made permanent. In 2004, he returned to England, joining Hednesford Town, but left the club towards the end of the 2004-05 season and joined Eastwood Town. He moved on to Ilkeston Town and Gedling Town, before signing for Carlton Town in October 2006.

Turner represented England at under-16 and under-18 level.

References

1981 births
Living people
Footballers from Nottingham
English footballers
England youth international footballers
Association football wingers
Association football forwards
Nottingham Forest F.C. players
West Bromwich Albion F.C. players
Herfølge Boldklub players
Hednesford Town F.C. players
Eastwood Town F.C. players
Ilkeston Town F.C. (1945) players
Gedling Town F.C. players
Carlton Town F.C. players
Danish Superliga players
Southern Football League players
English expatriate footballers
English expatriate sportspeople in Denmark